Stadion Rakovski is a multi-use stadium in Sevlievo, Bulgaria. It is used mostly for football matches and is the home ground of FC Sevlievo. The stadium holds a capacity for 8,816 people.

Football venues in Bulgaria
Buildings and structures in Gabrovo Province